Miss USA 2023 will be the 72nd Miss USA pageant that will be held in 2023 at the Grand Sierra Resort in Reno, Nevada. Morgan Romano of North Carolina will crown her successor at the end of the event. The winner will go on to represent the United States at Miss Universe 2023 competition which is scheduled to be held in El Salvador at the end of 2023.

Background

Location

On July 14, 2022, it was reported that the competition would be held in Reno, Nevada, with the city securing a three-year deal to host the pageant from 2022 to 2024. This will be the third time that the pageant is held in Reno, and a second consecutive year holding the pageant in the city, following Miss USA 2019 and 2022. Miss USA organization president Crystle Stewart said the location was chosen to honor Cheslie Kryst, who had been crowned Miss USA 2019 in the same venue and had died of suicide in January 2022.

On October 7, the license for Miss USA and its sister pageant Miss Teen USA were suspended and returned to the Miss Universe Organization due to allegations of rigging in the previous competition.

Selection of contestants
As with the previous year, contestants who have participated in each state with the eligibility rules applied which they are to compete not more than one state per year. Starting from this edition, the Miss Universe Organization has announced it would accept married women and mothers to compete in the pageant unless the eligibility will still be below 28 years of age.

Delegates from the 50 states and the District of Columbia are selected in state pageants which began in September 2022 and scheduled to conclude in August 2023, as the state pageant schedule can become very dense between the last state pageant held from 2022. The first state pageant was Idaho, held on September 11, 2022. Two state titleholders were former Miss Teen USA state winners, one was a former Miss World America state winner, and another was a former Miss America's Outstanding Teen state titleholder.

Contestants

Upcoming state pageants

Notes

References

External links

 

2023
2023 in the United States
2023 beauty pageants
Beauty pageants in the United States